Frankfurt Stresemannallee station is a railway station served by the S3 and S4 services of the Rhine-Main S-Bahn in the Sachsenhausen district of Frankfurt, Germany.

Gallery

References

Rhine-Main S-Bahn stations
Railway stations in Frankfurt